This is the list of cathedrals in Brazil sorted by denomination.

Anglican

Roman Catholic 
Cathedrals of the Roman Catholic Church in Brazil:
 Catedral Nossa Senhora da Conceição Peri in Abaetetuba
 Catedral Senhor Bom Jesus dos Remédios in Afogados da Ingazeira
 Cathedral of St. Anthony in Alagoinhas
 Cathedral of St. John the Baptist in Almenara
 Cathedral of the Holy Guardian Angels in Tabatinga
 Co-Cathedral of St. Paul the Apostle in São Paulo de Olivença
 Cathedral of Our Lady of Good Counsel in Amargosa
 Armenian Cathedral of St. Gregory the Illuminator in São Paulo (Armenian Catholic)
 Cathedral of Our Lady in Amparo
 Cathedral of the Good Lord Jesus in Anápolis
 Cathedral of St. Anthony in Guaratinguetá
 Cathedral of Our Lady of Lourdes in Petrópolis
 Metropolitan Cathedral of Our Lady of the Conception in Aracaju
 Cathedral of Our Lady of Apparition in Araçatuba
 Cathedral of St. Joseph in Araçuaí
 Cathedral of the Sacred Heart of Jesus in Assis
 Cathedral of St. Therese in Bacabal
 Cathedral of St. Sebastian in Bagé
 Cathedral of St. Francis of Assisi in Barra
 Cathedral of Our Lady of Guidance in Barra do Garças
 Cathedral of St. Ann in Barra do Piraí
 Cathedral of St. John the Baptist in Barreiras
 Cathedral of the Holy Spirit in Barretos
 Cathedral of the Holy Spirit in Bauru
 Metropolitan Cathedral of Our Lady of Graces in Belém
 Christ the King Cathedral in Belo Horizonte
 Catedral Metropolitana Nossa Senhora da Boa Viagem in Belo Horizonte
 Cathedral of St. Paul the Apostle in Blumenau
 Cathedral of the Good Jesus in Bom Jesus da Lapa
 Cathedral of Our Lady of Mercy in Bom Jesus
 Cathedral of Our Lord of the Good End in Senhor do Bonfim
 Prelatial Cathedral Basilica of St. Anthony of Padua in Borba
 Metropolitan Cathedral-Basilica of St. Ann in Botucatu
 Cathedral of Our Lady of the Rosary in Bragança
 Cathedral of Our Lady of the Conception in Bragança Paulista
 Metropolitan Cathedral of Our Lady of Apparition in Brasília
 Cathedral of Our Lady of the Conception in Brejo
 Cathedral of St. Francis of Assisi in Caçador
 Cathedral of Our Lady of the Conception in Cachoeira do Sul
 Cathedral of St. Peter the Apostle in Cachoeiro de Itapemirim
 Cathedral of St. Ann in Caetité
 Cathedral of St. Ann in Caicó
 Cathedral of Our Lady of Mercy in Cajazeiras
 Cathedral of St. Thomas of Canterbury in Camaçari
 Prelatial Cathedral of St. John the Baptist in Cametá
 Cathedral of St. Anthony in Campanha
 Cathedral of Our Lady of the Conception in Campina Grande
 Metropolitan Cathedral of Our Lady of the Conception in Campinas
 Metropolitan Cathedral of Our Lady of the Abbey and St. Anthony in Campo Grande
 Cathedral of St. Jude Thaddeus in Campo Limpo Paulista
 Cathedral of St. Anthony in Campo Maior
 Cathedral of St. Joseph in Campo Mourão
 Cathedral-Basilica of the Most Holy Saviour in Campos dos Goytacazes
 Cathedral of Our Lady of Lourdes in Canela
 Cathedral of the Holy Spirit in Caraguatatuba
 Cathedral of St. John the Baptist in Caratinga
 Cathedral of St. Peter of Alcantara in Carolina
 Cathedral of Our Lady of the Dolours in Caruaru
 Metropolitan Cathedral of Our Lady of Apparition in Cascavel
 Cathedral of Mary Mother of God in Castanhal
 Cathedral Shrine of Our Lady of Apparition in Catanduva
 Cathedral of Our Lady of the Remedies in Caxias
 Cathedral of St. Teresa in Caxias do Sul
 Cathedral of St. Anthony of Padua in Chapecó
 Prelatial Cathedral of St. Ann and St. Sebastian in Coari
 Cathedral of the Sacred Heart of Jesus in Colatina
 Cathedral of Christ the King in Cornélio Procópio
 Cathedral of Our Lady of Mercy in Coroatá
 Cathedral of Our Lady of Candelaria in Corumbá
 Cathedral of St. Joseph in Coxim
 Cathedral of Our Lord of the Good End in Crateús
 Cathedral of Our Lady of the Rock in Crato
 Cathedral of St. Joseph in Criciúma
 Prelatial Cathedral of Our Lady of Perpetual Help in Cristalândia
 Cathedral of the Holy Spirit in Cruz Alta
 Cathedral of Our Lady of Glory in Cruzeiro do Sul
 Metropolitan Cathedral-Basilica of the Good Lord Jesus in Cuiabá
 Catedral Metropolitana Basílica Nossa Senhora da Luz dos Pinhais in Curitiba
 Metropolitan Cathedral of St. Anthony in Diamantina
 Cathedral of the Immaculate Conception in Diamantino
 Cathedral of the Holy Spirit in Divinópolis
 Cathedral of Our Lady of the Conception in Dourados
 Cathedral of St. Anthony in Duque de Caxias
 Cathedral of St. Joseph in Erechim
 Cathedral of Our Lady of Guadalupe in Estância
 Cathedral of Our Lady Help of Christians in Eunápolis
 Metropolitan Cathedral of St. Ann in Feira de Santana
 Cathedral of the Good Jesus of the Afflicted in Floresta
 Cathedral of St. Peter of Alcantara in Floriano
 Metropolitan Cathedral of Our Lady of Exile in Florianópolis
 Cathedral of Our Lady of the Immaculate Conception in Formosa
 Metropolitan Cathedral of St. Joseph in Fortaleza
 Cathedral of St. John the Baptist in Foz do Iguaçu
 Cathedral of Our Lady of the Conception in Franca
 Cathedral of St. Anthony in Frederico Westphalen
 Cathedral of St. Anthony in Garanhuns
 Metropolitan Cathedral of Our Lady Help of Christians in Goiânia
 Cathedral of St. Ann in Goiás
 Cathedral of St. Anthony in Governador Valadares
 Cathedral of Our Lord of the Good End in Grajaú
 Catedral Nossa Senhora do Seringueiro in Guajará
 Cathedral of St. Michael in Guanhães
 Cathedral of Our Lady of Light in Guarabira
 Catedral Nossa Senhora de Belém in Guarapuava
 Cathedral of Our Lady of the Conception in Guarulhos
 Cathedral of Our Lady of the Dolours in Guaxupé
 Cathedral of St. John the Baptist in Guiratinga
 Cathedral of Our Lady of the Conception in Humaitá
 Cathedral of St. Ann in Iguatu
 Cathedral of St. Sebastian in Ilhéus
 Cathedral of Our Lady of Fatima in Imperatriz
 Cathedral of the Holy Spirit in Ipameri
 Cathedral of St. Dominic in Irecê
 Cathedral of Our Lady of the Rosary in Itabira
 Co-Cathedral of St. Sebastian in Coronel Fabriciano
 Cathedral of St. Joseph in Itabuna
 Prelatial Cathedral of Our Lady of the Rosary in Itacoatiara
 Cathedral of St. Francis Xavier in Itaguaí
 Prelatial Cathedral of St. Ann in Itaituba
 Catedral Nossa Senhora dos Prazeres in Itapetininga
 Cathedral of St. Ann in Itapeva
 Cathedral of Our Lady of Mercies in Itapipoca
 Cathedral of St. Joseph in Ituiutaba
 Cathedral of St. Rita of Cassia in Itumbiara
 Cathedral of Our Lady of Carmel in Jaboticabal
 Cathedral of Our Lady of the Conception and St. Sebastian in Jacarezinho
 Cathedral of Our Lady of the Assumption in Jales
 Cathedral of the Sacred Heart of Jesus in Janaúba
 Cathedral of Our Lady of the Dolours in Januária
 Cathedral of Our Lady of Fatima in Jardim
 Cathedral of the Holy Spirit in Jataí
 Cathedral of St. Anthony of Padua in Jequié
 Cathedral of St. John Bosco in Ji-Paraná
 Cathedral of St. Therese of the Child Jesus in Joaçaba
 Cathedral of St. Francis Xavier in Joinville
 Catedral Nossa Senhora das Grotas in Juazeiro
 Cathedral of the Sacred Heart of Jesus in Juína
 Metropolitan Cathedral of St. Anthony in Juiz de Fora
 Cathedral of Our Lady of Exile in Jundiaí
 Prelatial Cathedral of Our Lady of Nazareth in Lábrea
 Catedral Nossa Senhora dos Prazeres in Lages
 Cathedral of St. Sebastian in Leopoldina
 Cathedral of Our Lady of the Dolours in Limeira
 Cathedral of Our Lady of the Conception in Limoeiro do Norte
 Cathedral of St. Anthony in Lins
 Catedral Nossa Senhora do Livramento in Livramento de Nossa Senhora
 Metropolitan Cathedral of the Sacred Heart of Jesus in Londrina
 Cathedral of Our Lady of Mercy in Lorena
 Cathedral of Our Lady of Light in Luz
 Cathedral of Our Lady of Evangelization in Luziânia
 Cathedral of St. Joseph in Macapá
 Catedral Metropolitana Nossa Senhora dos Prazeres in Maceió
 Metropolitan Cathedral of Our Lady of the Conception in Manaus
 Cathedral of Our Lady of Perpetual Help in Marabá
 Cathedral of Our Lady of Consolation in Soure
 Metropolitan Cathedral-Basilica of Our Lady of Assumption in Mariana
 Cathedral-Basilica of St. Benedict in Marília
 Metropolitan Cathedral-Basilica of Our Lady of Glory in Maringá
 Cathedral of St. Therese of the Child Jesus in Miracema do Tocantins
 Cathedral of St. Ann in Mogi das Cruzes
 Cathedral of St. John the Baptist in Montenegro
 Metropolitan Cathedral of Our Lady of Apparition in Montes Claros
 Cathedral of St. Lucia in Mossoró
 Metropolitan Cathedral of Our Lady of the Presentation in Natal
 Our Lady of Fatima Cathedral, Naviraí
 Cathedral of Our Lady of the Conception in Nazaré da Mata
 Metropolitan Cathedral of St. John the Baptist in Niterói
 Cathedral of Our Lady of Lebanon in São Paulo (Maronite Rite)
 Melkite Cathedral of Our Lady in São Paulo (Melkite Greek)
 Cathedral of St. John the Baptist in Nova Friburgo
 Catedral Santo Antônio de Jacutinga in Nova Iguaçu
 Cathedral-Basilica of St. Louis Gonzaga in Novo Hamburgo
 Metropolitan Cathedral of St. Ann in Óbidos
 Cathedral of Our Lady of Victory in Oeiras
 Metropolitan Cathedral of Holy Saviour of the World in Olinda
 Co-Cathedral of St. Peter of Clerics in Recife
 Catedral Nossa Senhora de Oliveira in Oliveira
 Military Cathedral of St. Mary of the Military Queen of Peace in Brasília
 Cathedral of St. Anthony in Osasco
 Cathedral of Our Lady of the Conception in Osório
 Cathedral of the Good Lord Jesus in Ourinhos
 Catedral Nossa Senhora da Conceição dos Montes in Palmares
 Metropolitan Cathedral of St. Joseph in Palmas, Tocantins
 Catedral Senhor Bom Jesus da Coluna in Palmas, Paraná
 Co-Cathedral of Our Lady of Glory in Francisco Beltrão
 Catedral Nossa Senhora do Amparo in Palmeira dos Índios
 Cathedral of St. Anthony in Paracatu
 Metropolitan Cathedral-Basilica of Our Lady of the Snows in João Pessoa
 Cathedral of Our Lady of the Rosary in Paranaguá
 Prelatial Cathedral of St. Francis Xavier in Paranatinga
 Cathedral of Mary Mother of the Church in Paranavaí
 Cathedral of Our Lady of Carmel in Parintins
 Cathedral of Our Lady of Grace in Parnaíba
 Cathedral of Our Lady of Apparition in Passo Fundo
 Cathedral of Our Lady of Guidance in Patos
 Cathedral of St. Anthony of Padua in Patos de Minas
 Cathedral of Our Lady of Fatima in Paulo Afonso
 Cathedral of St. Francis of Paola in Pelotas
 Cathedral of Our Lady of the Rosary in Penedo
 Cathedral of St. Agueda in Pesqueira
 Cathedral of the Sacred Heart of Jesus Christ the King in Petrolina
 Cathedral of St. Peter of Alcantara in Petrópolis
 Catedral Nossa Senhora dos Remédios in Picos
 Cathedral of St. Ignatius of Loyola in Pinheiro
 Cathedral of St. Anthony in Piracicaba
 Cathedral of Our Lady of the Conception in Ponta de Pedras
 Cathedral of St. Ann in Ponta Grossa
 Metropolitan Cathedral of Our Lady Mother of God in Porto Alegre
 Cathedral of Our Lady of Mercies in Porto Nacional
 Metropolitan Cathedral of the Sacred Heart of Jesus in Porto Velho
 Metropolitan Cathedral of the Good Jesus in Pouso Alegre
 Cathedral of St. Sebastian in Presidente Prudente
 Cathedral of St. Anthony in Propriá
 Cathedral of Jesus, Mary and Joseph in Quixadá
 Cathedral of St. Francis Xavier in Registro
 Metropolitan Cathedral of St. Sebastian in Ribeirão Preto
 Cathedral of Our Lady of Nazareth in Rio Branco
 Cathedral of St. John the Baptist in Rio do Sul
 Cathedral of St. Peter in Rio Grande
 Cathedral of the Holy Cross in Rondonópolis
 Cathedral of Christ Redeemer in Boa Vista
 Cathedral of Our Lady of Glory in Rubiataba
 Co-Cathedral of Our Lady of Perpetual Help in Mozarlândia
 Cathedral of St. Anthony in Ruy Barbosa
 St. Anthony Cathedral in Salgueiro
 Cathedral of St. John the Baptist in Santa Cruz do Sul
 Cathedral of the Immaculate Conception in Santa Maria
 Cathedral of Our Lady of the Conception in Santarém
 Cathedral of Our Lady of the Conception in Conceição do Araguaia
 Catedral Santo Amaro in Santo Amaro
 Cathedral of Our Lady of Carmel in Santo André
 Cathedral of Guardian Angel in Santo Ângelo
 Cathedral of Our Lady of the Rosary in Santos
 Cathedral of St. Charles Borromeo in São Carlos
 Prelatial Cathedral of Our Lady of the Assumption in São Félix do Araguaia
 Cathedral of St. Gabriel in São Gabriel da Cachoeira
 Ukrainian Cathedral of St. John the Baptist in Curitiba (Ukrainian Rite)
 Cathedral of St. John the Baptist in São João da Boa Vista
 Cathedral-Basilica of Our Lady of the Pillar in São João del Rei
 Principal Church of the Immaculate Conception of Our Lady of the Rosary of Fatima in Campos dos Goytacazes
 Cathedral of St. Joseph in São José do Rio Preto
 Catedral de São Dimas in São José dos Campos
 Catedral de São José dos Pinhais in São José dos Pinhais
 Cathedral of St. Louis Gonzaga in São Luís de Montes Belos
 Metropolitan Cathedral of Our Lady of Victory in São Luís
 Cathedral of St. Louis of France in Cáceres
 Cathedral of St. Matthew in São Mateus
 Cathedral of St. Michael the Archangel in São Paulo
 Metropolitan Cathedral of Our Lady of the Assumption and St. Paul in São Paulo
 Cathedral of St. Raymond in São Raimundo Nonato
 Primatial Cathedral Basilica of the Transfiguration of the Lord in São Salvador da Bahia
 Metropolitan Cathedral of St. Sebastian in Rio de Janeiro
 Cathedral of St. Ann in Serrinha
 Cathedral of St. Anthony in Sete Lagoas
 Cathedral of St. Anthony in Sinop
 Cathedral of Our Lady of the Conception in Sobral
 Catedral Metropolitana Nossa Senhora da Ponte in Sorocaba
 Cathedral of St. Francis of Assisi in Taubaté
 Prelatial Cathedral of St. Teresa in Tefé
 Cathedral of St. Peter in Teixeira de Freitas
 Co-Cathedral of St. Anthony in Caravelas
 Cathedral of Our Lady of the Immaculate Conception in Teófilo Otoni
 Metropolitan Cathedral of Our Lady of Dolours in Teresina
 Cathedral of St. Ann in Tianguá
 Cathedral of Our Lady of Consolation in Tocantinópolis
 Cathedral of Christ the King in Toledo
 Cathedral of St. Anthony in Três Lagoas
 Cathedral of Our Lady of Mercy in Tubarão
 Metropolitan Cathedral of the Sacred Heart of Jesus in Uberaba
 Cathedral of St. Therese in Uberlândia
 Cathedral of the Holy Spirit in Umuarama
 Cathedral of the Sacred Heart of Jesus in União da Vitória
 Cathedral of St. Ann in Uruaçu
 Cathedral of St. Ann in Uruguaiana
 Catedral Nossa Senhora da Oliveira in Vacaria
 Cathedral of Our Lady of Glory in Valença
 Cathedral of Our Lady of the Conception in Viana
 Metropolitan Cathedral of Our Lady of Victory in Vitória
 Metropolitan Cathedral of Our Lady of the Victories in Vitória da Conquista
 Prelatial Cathedral of the Sacred Heart of Jesus in Altamira
 Cathedral of St. Anthony of Padua in Zé Doca

Eastern Orthodox
Cathedrals of Eastern Orthodox Churches in Brazil:

 Metropolitan Orthodox Cathedral of St. Paul in São Paulo (Greek Orthodox Patriarchate of Antioch)
 Orthodox Cathedral of the Blessed Virgin Mary in Rio de Janeiro (Polish Orthodox)
 Catedral Ortodoxa Ucrâniana São Demétrio in Curitiba (Ukrainian Orthodox Church of USA)
 Catedral Ortodoxa da Santíssima Virgem Maria in Rio de Janeiro (Polish Orthodox Church)

See also
List of cathedrals

References

Cathedrals in Brazil
Brazil
Cathedrals
Cathedrals